A Rare Lover or Pikanterie is a 1950 West German romance film directed by Alfred Braun and starring Susanne von Almassy, Irene von Meyendorff and Curd Jürgens.

The film's sets were designed by the art director Emil Hasler. It was shot in Belgium, Paris, Geneva and West Berlin.

Synopsis
The film is set in Paris and concerns the publication of a racy new novel.

Cast
 Susanne von Almassy as Gabrielle Courtois
 Irene von Meyendorff as Hortense Clairmont
 Curd Jürgens as Sascha Borotraz
 Hubert von Meyerinck as Poule, Verlege
 Hans Olden as Bankpräsident
 Carl-Heinz Schroth as Pierre, Diener
 Marina Ried as Angèle, Zofe
 Elisabeth Flickenschildt as Madame Laroche
 Franz Weber Baptiste, Kammerdiener
 Walter Gross

References

Bibliography
 Bock, Hans-Michael & Bergfelder, Tim. The Concise CineGraph. Encyclopedia of German Cinema. Berghahn Books, 2009.

External links 
 

1950 films
1950s romance films
German romance films
West German films
1950s German-language films
Films directed by Alfred Braun
Films set in Paris
German films based on plays
German black-and-white films
1950s German films